Walker Reynolds (September 12, 1888 – March 1977) was a college football and baseball player. He was an end for the Auburn Tigers football team, captain of the 1909 team. He was also a pitcher on the baseball team. Walker Reynolds Tichenor was his first cousin.

Reynolds joined the Alabama Pipe Company in 1924 and retired in 1959.

References

American football ends
Auburn Tigers football players
All-Southern college football players
Auburn Tigers baseball players
Baseball pitchers
Sportspeople from Anniston, Alabama
1888 births
1977 deaths
American football halfbacks